Cruz del Eje Department is a  department of Córdoba Province in Argentina.

The provincial subdivision has a population of about 52,172 inhabitants in an area of 6,653 km², and its capital city is Cruz del Eje, which is located around 861 km from Capital Federal.

Settlements
 Alto de Los Quebrachos
 Bañado de Soto
 Cruz de Caña
 Cruz del Eje
 El Brete
 Guanaco Muerto
 La Batea
 La Higuera
 Las Cañadas
 Las Playas
 Los Chañaritos
 Media Naranja
 Paso Viejo
 San Marcos Sierras
 Serrezuela
 Tuclame
 Villa de Soto

1908 earthquake
On September 22, 1908 the region was struck by an earthquake measuring 6.5 on the Richter scale.

Departments of Córdoba Province, Argentina